The Maracaibo Metro, also known as Metro del Sol Amado, is a six-station light rail system in Maracaibo, Venezuela. Service between La Vanega and El Varillal (skipping Urdaneta) opened to the public on 25 November 2006, with the last station on the line opened on 9 June 2009.

The line encompasses the suburbs of Maracaibo and Maracaibo itself as drop-off point. Also one station is a transfer point between rail services provided by IAFE. There are a total of six stations along the line – two elevated stations (Urdaneta and Libertador), and four at-grade stations. 

The line was built by the city government of Maracaibo and the Venezuelan national government. In March 2009 it was reported that corruption allegations regarding the 1998 signing of the construction contract with Siemens were being investigated.

Lines

Line 1 

The totally planned system of four lines shall have  in the future. 

German company Siemens is supplying signalling, telecommunication and electrification systems as well as the first 7 metro trains, based on the vehicles running on the Prague Metro line C.

The first of 4 proposed lines, Line 1, has opened some stations while others are still under construction or in the planning/design stages. 
A feeder  support line connects the maintenance and train yard areas to the terminal station Altos de La Vanega.

Stations 
Line 1: First Stage

 Altos de La Vanega
 El Varillal
 El Guayabal
 Sabaneta
 Urdaneta
 Libertador

Line 1: Second Stage (Under study) 

Probable additional stations are:

 Padilla
 Falcón
 5 de Julio
 Paraíso
 Indio Mara
 Universidad
 Polideportivo
 Galerías
 Panamericano
 Mercado Periférico
 La Curva de Molina

Rolling stock 
The Maracaibo Metro is served by 7 sets of 3-car Siemens Mobility trains, a modification of the M1 type rolling stock used on the Prague Metro.

See also 
 Trolmérida
 IAFE
 Caracas Metro
 Los Teques Metro
 Valencia Metro
 List of Latin American rail transit systems by ridership
 Medium-capacity rail transport system (light metro)
 List of rapid transit systems

References

External links

Metro Maracaibo – official website 
Maracaibo (Metro) at UrbanRail.net
Allen Morrison – Early tramways system Maracaibo

Maracaibo
Rapid transit in Venezuela
Railway lines opened in 2006
2006 establishments in Venezuela